David Wemyss may refer to:

 David Wemyss (died 1332), Scottish noble
 David Wemyss, 2nd Earl of Wemyss (1610–1679), army officer
 David Wemyss, 4th Earl of Wemyss (1678–1720), Scottish peer and Member of Parliament
 David Wemyss, Lord Elcho (1721–1787), Scottish peer and Jacobite army officer
 David Douglas Wemyss (1760–1839), British Army officer